Why Bliss Destroy is the debut EP released by Sucioperro in August 2002 and features the original line up of JP Reid, Mike Logg, Dave Martin and (Skindog) Brendan Reilly.

"Love in the Guise of Friendship" is an arrangement of a poem by Scottish writer Robert Burns.

Three tracks feature the vocals of Biffy Clyro frontman Simon Neil.

Track listing

Personnel
JP Reid - Vocals, Guitars
Mike Logg - Bass
Brendan Reilly - Drums
Dave Martin - Guitar, Piano & Vocals
Simon Neil - Vocals on "Hangover", "Love In The Guise" & "Capable Of More"
Duncan MacFarlane - Guitar on "Love In The Guise"

Recording 
All tracks recorded at Cava Studios, Glasgow.
Engineered by Dave Paterson.
Written, arranged and produced by Sucioperro.

Sucioperro albums
2002 EPs